Viola Fletcher (née Ford; born May 5, 1914), also known as Mother Fletcher, is the oldest known survivor of the Tulsa race massacre. One hundred years after the massacre, she testified before Congress about the need for reparations.

Early life 
Fletcher was born May 5, 1914, in Comanche, Oklahoma to Lucinda Ellis and John Wesley Ford. She was the second oldest of eight children. She has a younger brother, Hughes Van Ellis, who was a newborn at the time of the massacre and as of 2021 was 100. The house had no electricity. Before moving to Tulsa the family were sharecroppers. In Tulsa the family attended St. Andrew, a Black Baptist church. 

Fletcher told Congress that due to family circumstances after the massacre, she left school after the 4th grade.

Experiences during the massacre 
Her family, including four of her siblings, was living in Greenwood, a wealthy Black neighborhood of Tulsa, at the time of the massacre. Fletcher was seven years old at the time of the massacre. She was in bed asleep on May 31, 1921, when the massacre began; her mother woke the family and they fled. The family lost everything but the clothes they were wearing. She is the oldest known survivor of the massacre. She sleeps sitting up on her couch with the lights on.

Testimony before Congress 
Fletcher testified about reparations before the U.S. Congress on May 19, 2021, along with her 100-year-old brother Hughes and Lessie Benningfield Randle, who was 106.

Fletcher told Congress:
 She testified that the city of Tulsa had used the names of victims and images of the massacre to generate money for the city.

In 2022, Fletcher, her brother, and Randle received $1M from New York philanthropist Ed Mitzen.

Visit to Ghana 
In August 2021 Fletcher and her brother Hughes visited Ghana. They met with Ghanaian president Nana Akufo-Addo. She was crowned a queen mother and given several Ghanaian names, including Naa Lamiley, which means, “Somebody who is strong. Somebody who stands the test of time”, Naa Yaoteley, which means “the first female child in a family or bloodline”, and Ebube Ndi Igbo.

Oral history project 
Fletcher was interviewed in 2014 for an oral history project conducted by the Oklahoma Oral History Research program and the Oklahoma State University College of Human Sciences.

Personal life 
In 1932, at the age of 18, she married Robert Fletcher and moved with him to California, where they both worked in shipyards, Viola as an assistant welder. They returned to Oklahoma after World War II and raised three children while she worked cleaning houses. Fletcher worked until she was 85.

Fletcher was also known as Mother Fletcher or Mother Viola Fletcher.

References 

1914 births
Living people
African-American women
American centenarians
People from Stephens County, Oklahoma
Tulsa race massacre
Women centenarians